Martin Vyskoč (born 10 June 1977) is a Slovak footballer. He competed in the men's tournament at the 2000 Summer Olympics.

References

1977 births
Living people
Slovak footballers
Olympic footballers of Slovakia
Footballers at the 2000 Summer Olympics
Sportspeople from Liptovský Mikuláš
Association football midfielders